Dagmar Carola Adelaide Cronstedt (5 October, 1919–5 December, 2006) was a Swedish countess who during the Second World War worked at Radio Königsberg, broadcasting German propaganda to neutral Sweden. She mainly did a talk show together with Brita Bager, focussing on current news events. 

She married the Nobel prize winner physiologist and pharmacologist Ulf von Euler in 1958.

References

Swedish radio personalities
Swedish women radio presenters
Swedish collaborators with Nazi Germany
Swedish Nazis
1919 births
2006 deaths
Swedish countesses

Dagmar